Yuri II Boleslav (c. 1305/1310 – April 7, 1340), was King of Ruthenia and Dominus of the lands of Galicia–Volhynia (1325-1340). A foreigner and a Catholic by birth, he was the son of Trojden I, Duke of Masovia and a member of the Polish Piast dynasty. Highly unpopular in Orthodox Ruthenia, his murder prompted a war of succession, known as the Galicia–Volhynia Wars.

Biography
Bolesław was born between 1305 and 1310 to Trojden I of Masovia and Maria, daughter of Yuri I of Galicia. Since his father was still a ruler of the family's Masovian lands, in 1323 Bolesław succeeded Leo II of Galicia and became the ruler over Ruthenia as Yuri II. He also received the Duchy of Belz after the childless death of Andrew of Galicia. In 1331, he married the daughter of Grand Duke of Lithuania Gediminas and sister of Aldona of Lithuania, wife of Casimir III of Poland. The name of Bolesław's wife is disputed; Teodor Narbutt claimed her pagan name was Eufemia and her Christian name was Maria. In opposition, Oswald Balzer claimed that Eufemia was a Christian name. It is widely believed that Narbutt's account was a fabrication.

In a treaty of 1338 Yuri ІІ offered Casimir III of Poland succession to the throne of Galicia-Volhynia. In 1324, Yuri granted city rights to Volodymyr and Sanok in 1339, both under Magdeburg Law. He was poisoned in 1340 by Orthodox Ruthenian boyars and died without an heir, before his father who continued rule the Duchy of Mazovia.

Yuri's murder sparked the Galicia–Volhynia Wars fought in the years 1340–1392 over the succession in the Kingdom of Ruthenia.

Notes

References
 Jan Řežabek, Jiří II", poslední kníže veśkeré Malé Rusi, kritickí pokus, «Časopis musea království českého», ročnik LVII, Praha, 1883.
 Oswald Balzer Genealogia Piastów (1895) (see: Digitalbibliothek of Great Poland)
 Maciej Wilamowski Piastowie. Leksykon biograficzny, Kraków 1999.

1308 births
1340 deaths
Kings of Rus'
Dukes of Masovia
14th-century murdered monarchs
Deaths by poisoning
Eastern Orthodox monarchs
Piast dynasty
Romanovichi family